Uhlenhorst is a quarter of Hamburg, Germany in the Hamburg-Nord borough.

References 

Quarters of Hamburg
Hamburg-Nord